Thomas Löffler (born 1 May 1989) is a retired Austrian footballer and current manager of Austrian club FC Koch Türe Natters.

Career

Coaching career
Löffler started his coaching career in 2016, when he was hired as a youth coach - while playing for the clubs first team - at UVB Vöcklamarkt. Subsequently, he spent a few years as a youth coach in the Salzburg Football Association. 

In June 2020, Löfler moved to SV Wörgl, where he would function as a player-assistant and head of the clubs youth sector. In February 2021, Löffler returned to his former club, Wacker Innsbruck, as a youth coach. Ahead of the 2021-22 season, he took charge of the clubs 3rd senior team. On 3 June 2022, Wacker confirmed that Löffler, with Florian Anderle as his assistant coach, would take charge of the clubs reserve team until the end of the season.

In July 2022, he was appointed manager of Tiroler Liga side FC Koch Türe Natters.

References

External links
Thomas Löffler ÖFB (player profile)
Thomas Löffler ÖFB (manager profile)

1989 births
Living people
Austrian footballers
Austrian Football Bundesliga players
FC Wacker Innsbruck (2002) players
TSV Hartberg players
SV Wörgl players
People from Innsbruck-Land District
Footballers from Tyrol (state)
Association football defenders